Rana Javadi (born 1953 is an Iranian photographer and museum founder.

Self-taught in the art of photography, Javadi began working  as the Director of Photo and Pictorial Studies at the Cultural Research Bureau in Tehran in 1989. From 1997 to 1999 she was a founding member of Askhaneh Shahr, Iran's first museum of photography; she is also on the editorial board of the photography journal Aksnameh. During her career she has exhibited widely both in Iran and abroad. Her work includes the series "When You Were Dying", in which she takes old studio photographs from Iran and uses them as the basis for photocollages involving fabrics, flowers, and other items. She has also been active as a documentary photographer, chronicling the Iranian Revolution and the Iran-Iraq War. Javadi is the widow of photographer Bahman Jalali.

One work by Javadi, an untitled 1978 photograph from the series "Days of Blood, Days of Fire", is currently in the collection of the Arthur M. Sackler Gallery of the Smithsonian Institution.

References

1953 births
Living people
Iranian photographers
20th-century Iranian women artists
20th-century photographers
20th-century women photographers
21st-century Iranian women artists
21st-century photographers
21st-century women photographers